The 8th Rand Grand Prix was a motor race, run to Formula One-style rules, held on 4 December 1965 at Kyalami, South Africa. The race was run over 50 laps of the circuit, and was won by Australian driver Jack Brabham in a Brabham BT11.

The Formula One rules for 1966 were to dispense with the old 1.5-litre engines in favour of 3-litre engines. The South African Drivers' Championship had already been run to these rules throughout 1965, so this race was the first in which some of the established drivers and teams from the World Championship competed under the new rules, while the local drivers already had experience with them.

Results

Jackie Pretorius was also entered under his own name to drive an LDS-Alfa Romeo but did not race this car.

References
 Race results at the F2 Register 

Rand Grand Prix
Rand Grand Prix
Rand Grand Prix
Rand Grand Prix